Moritz Benedikt Cantor (23 August 1829 – 10 April 1920) was a German historian of mathematics.

Biography
Cantor was born at Mannheim. He came from a Sephardi Jewish family that had emigrated to the Netherlands from Portugal, another branch of which had established itself in Russia. In his early youth, Moritz Cantor was not strong enough to go to school, and his parents decided to educate him at home. Later, however, he was admitted to an advanced class of the Gymnasium in Mannheim. From there he went to the University of Heidelberg in 1848, and soon after to the University of Göttingen, where he studied under Gauss and Weber, and where Stern awakened in him a strong interest in historical research.

After obtaining his PhD at the University of Heidelberg in 1851, he went to Berlin, where he eagerly followed the lectures of Peter Gustav Lejeune Dirichlet; and upon his return to Heidelberg in 1853, he was appointed privat-docent at the university. In 1863, he was promoted to the position of assistant professor, and in 1877 he became honorary professor.

Cantor was one of the founders of the Kritische Zeitschrift für Chemie, Physik und Mathematik. In 1859 he became associated with Schlömilch as editor of the Zeitschrift für Mathematik und Physik, taking charge of the historical and literary section. Since 1877, through his efforts, a supplement to the Zeitschrift was published under the separate title of Abhandlungen zur Geschichte der Mathematik.

Cantor's inaugural dissertation, "Über ein weniger gebräuchliches Coordinaten-System" (1851), gave no indication that the history of exact sciences would soon be enriched by a master work by him. His first important work was "Über die Einführung unserer gegenwärtigen Ziffern in Europa", which he wrote for the Zeitschrift für Mathematik und Physik, 1856, vol. i.

His greatest work was Vorlesungen über Geschichte der Mathematik. This comprehensive history of mathematics appeared as follows:
 Volume 1 (1880) - From the earliest times until 1200
 Volume 2 (1892) - From 1200 to 1668
 Volume 3 (1894-1896) - From 1668 to 1758
 Volume 4 (1908) (with nine collaborators, Cantor as editor) - From 1759 to 1799

Many historians credit him for founding a new discipline in a field that had hitherto lacked the sound, conscientious, and critical methods of other fields of history.

In 1900 Moritz Cantor received the honor of giving a plenary address at the International Congress of Mathematicians in Paris (Sur l'historiographie des mathématiques).

References

Sources
 Jewish Encyclopedia, 1906

External links

 Florian Cajori, Moritz Cantor, The historian of mathematics, Bull. Amer. Math. Soc. 26 (1920), pp. 21-28.
 
 
 

1829 births
1920 deaths
19th-century German mathematicians
20th-century German mathematicians
German historians of mathematics
Heidelberg University alumni
University of Göttingen alumni
German Sephardi Jews
Scientists from Mannheim